Kin no Ai, Gin no Ai (金の愛、銀の愛 Golden Love, Silver Love) is the 20th single from Japanese idol girl group SKE48, being released on . The song reached number one on the Oricon Weekly Singles Chart, selling 251,639 copies in the first week. It also reached number one on the Billboard Japan Hot 100.

The title track is the main theme for the television drama Death Cash, which also starts SKE48 member Jurina Matsui and is her first lead actress role.

The song was released on multiple CD editions which came with a full version of a music video, which will not be released on YouTube. The only performance for the full song, aired on AKB48 SHOW, on August 20, 2016. This is the last single to feature Aya Shibata.

Track listing

Type A

Type B

Type C

Type D

Theater version

Personnel

"Kin no Ai, Gin no Ai" 
The performers of the main single are:
Team S: Azuma Rion, Oya Masana, Kitagawa Ryoha, Futamura Haruka, Jurina Matsui
Team KII: Ego Yuna, Oba Mina, Souda Sarina, Takayanagi Akane, Furuhata Nao, Takeuchi Saki, Hidaka Yuzuki
Team E: Kimoto Kanon, Kumazaki Haruka, Goto Rara, Saito Makiko, Suda Akari, Tani Marika

"Happy Rankings" 
"Happy Rankings was performed by the SKE48 grouping Ranking Girls, consisting of:
Team S: Kitagawa Ryoha, Takeuchi Mai, Futamura Haruka, Matsui Jurina, Miyamae Ami, Yamauchi Suzuran
Team KII: Ego Yuna, Oba Mina, Souda Sarina, Takayanagi Akane, Takeuch Sakii, Hidaka Yuzuki, Furuhata Nao
Team E: Kamata Natsuki, Kimoto Kanon, Kumazaki Haruka, Sakai Mei, Sato Sumire, Suda Akari, Tani Marika

"Madogiwa Lover" 
"Madogiwa Lover" was performed by the SKE48 grouping Next Selection, consisting of:
Team S: Noguchi Yume, Matsumoto Chikako
Team KII: Arai Yuki, Kitano Ruka
Team E: Ichino Narumi, Kamata Natsuki, Takatera Sana, Fukushi Nao

"Sayonara ga Utsukushikute" 
The performers of this song are:
Team S: Inuzuka Asana, Takeuchi Mai, Tsuzuki Rika
Team KII: Takagi Yumana
Team E: Kimoto Kanon, Sakai Mei, Shibata Aya

"ii Hito ii Hito Sagi" 
"ii Hito ii Hito Sagi" was performed by the SKE48 grouping Yanchana Tenshi to Yasashi Akuma, consisting of:
Team S: Goto Risako, Sugiyama Aika, Nojima Kano, Yakata Miki, Yamada Juna
Team S Draftee: Isshiki Rena, Kamimura Ayuka
Team KII: Aoki Shiori, Ishida Anna, Uchiyama Mikoto, Obata Yuna, Shirai Kotono, Takatsuka Natsuki, Matsumura Kaori
Team KII Draftee: Mizuno Airi
Team E: Ida Reona, Sugawara Maya
Trainee: Aikawa Honoka, Asai Yuka, Ota Ayaka, Kataoka Narumi, Kawasaki Narumi, Suenaga Oka, Takahata Yuki, Machi Otoha, Murai Junna, Wada Aina

"Kon'ya wa Shake it!" 
Kon'ya wa Shake it! was performed by Love Crescendo.

Release history

Notes

References 

2016 singles
2016 songs
Oricon Weekly number-one singles
Billboard Japan Hot 100 number-one singles
SKE48 songs
Avex Trax singles